Tamás Tóth (born 5 January 1992) is a Hungarian Paralympic swimmer. He is a Paralympic champion, a three-time World Championships bronze medalist and one-time European champion. He was born with an underdeveloped right hand caused by amniotic band syndrome.

Tóth achieved the Knight's Cross of the Hungarian Order of Merit in 2012 and the Officer's Cross of the Hungarian Order of Merit in 2016 after his success at the 2012 Summer Paralympics and 2016 Summer Paralympics.

References

1992 births
Living people
Swimmers from Budapest
Paralympic swimmers of Hungary
Swimmers at the 2012 Summer Paralympics
Swimmers at the 2016 Summer Paralympics
Medalists at the 2012 Summer Paralympics
Medalists at the 2016 Summer Paralympics
Medalists at the World Para Swimming Championships
Medalists at the World Para Swimming European Championships
Knight's Crosses of the Order of Merit of the Republic of Hungary (civil)
Officer's Crosses of the Order of Merit of the Republic of Hungary (civil)
S9-classified Paralympic swimmers